Ethmia petersterlingi is a moth in the family Depressariidae. The habitat consists of rain forests.

The ground color of the forewings is whitish with blackish markings and one distinct spot at the base. There is an oblique, thin dark mark from before the mid-costa connecting with a longitudinal blotch from the middle to the termen. The hindwing ground colour is whitish, but darker at the margins.

The larvae feed on Cordia alliodora.

Etymology
The species is named in honor of Peter Sterling, professor emeritus of the University of Pennsylvania and resident of Panamá, for his coaching and encouragement of the early days of Área de Conservación Guanacaste growth, and for his support of the blossoming of school children biodiversity education in Panamá.

References

Moths described in 2014
petersterlingi